"Let It Whip" is a 1982 single by the Dazz Band and their biggest hit, peaking at number one on the R&B chart for five non-consecutive weeks. The single also reached number two on the Dance chart and number five on the Billboard Hot 100 chart. The song won the 1982 Grammy Award for Best R&B Performance by a Duo or Group with Vocals.

Song
Co-written by producers Reggie Andrews and Leon "Ndugu" Chancler, performed by the Dazz Band, "Let It Whip" features a percolating drum machine rhythm underneath live drums, and a Minimoog bassline, underneath an electric bass guitar.

Chart history

Weekly charts

Year-end charts

CDB version

Australian boy band CDB released a version in April 1998 as the third single from their second studio album, Lifted (1997). The song peaked at number 51 on the ARIA Charts.

Track listing
'CD single (665254 2)
 "Let It Whip"	
 "Back Then" (Dance Remix)	
 "Good Times" (MI:II Remix)	
 "Let It Whip"  (Instrumental) 

Charts

Other covers/sampling
"Let It Whip" is featured in the skateboard film DVS Skate More and in the films Grosse Pointe Blank (1997), Next Friday (2000), Adventures of Power (2008) and Almost Christmas (2016).

The song also plays during the “Aww Snap!” round of the NBC game show Ellen’s Game of Games.

The song appears on the radio station Bounce FM in Grand Theft Auto: San AndreasIt has been covered by Boyz II Men, SR-71 on the soundtrack to The New Guy, and George Lam (titled as the Cantonese song "愛到發燒"). The song was also covered by fictional a cappella group The Treblemakers in the 2012 film Pitch Perfect and is featured on the film's soundtrack.

Hip hop group The Treacherous Three sampled the song in their version called "Whip It", also released in 1982.

Christian hip hop artist Lecrae sampled the song in his song "Let It Whip" (featuring Paul Wall) on his 2013 mix tape Church Clothes 2''.

Justin Timberlake sampled the song in a remix version of his 2003 hit "Cry Me a River".

The song is also sampled in the song "Let It Whip" by Purple Disco Machine (2012).

In 2015, the song was sampled by LunchMoney Lewis in his song "Whip It!".

References

External links

https://www.allmusic.com/song/let-it-whip-mt0026820217
 

1981 songs
1982 singles
1998 singles
Dazz Band songs
CDB (band) songs
Motown singles
Sony Music Australia singles